The PanAm Post is a conservative libertarian and anti-socialist news and opinion website launched in 2013 by Luis Henrique Ball Zuloaga. It publishes Spanish and English news, investigations, and opinion from a free market perspective and "in the tradition of pan-Americanism." The outlet is based is in Miami, Florida.

History
The site was founded in 2013 by Luis Henrique Ball Zuloaga, the third cousin of Venezuelan opposition politician María Corina Machado. Ball stated that PanAm Post began as a project to counter the reporting of news outlets in Latin America that he believed had been "taken over by socialist ideas." While the platform was originally launched to offer news and analysis on Latin America for English-speaking audiences, by 2019 its content was primarily published in Spanish.

Following its launch, former editor-in-chief Fergus Hodgson wrote that the PanAm Post was a new generation of journalists dedicated to bilingual coverage of social movements. Hodgson criticized what he called the "bloated and inefficient organizational structures" of legacy media and cited local U.S. journalist Ben Swann as a source of inspiration.

Demographics
The majority of visitors to the PanAm Post are from the United States, followed by Venezuela, Guatemala, Argentina, and Colombia, in that order. Most visitors are college educated and visit the website at home.

Reception
Political commentators and academics have associated the PanAm Post with hyper-partisan reporting that is prone to promoting falsehoods and using questionable far-right sources, such as The Epoch Times. Communication studies researchers at the University of Valencia regarded the PanAm Post in 2022 as pseudo-media alongside publications such as Breitbart News and Okdiario. Pseudo-media, they noted, describes publications that imitate the reporting styles of traditional media "while infringing the most basic journalistic conventions, such as the conflation of data and commentary, with an overt ideological bias."

In 2015, dean of the Dietrich College of Humanities and Social Sciences of Carnegie Mellon University Richard Scheines praised the PanAm Post as "an incredibly rich online site that covers news and offers excellent analyses of all regions in the Americas." In 2019 and 2020, the PanAm Post was ranked by the University of Pennsylvania's Think Tanks and Civil Societies Program as one of the most prominent free-market media websites in the world measured by social media impact.

Controversies

FARC defamation lawsuit 
On August 20, 2019, PanAm Post editor-in-chief Vanessa Vallejo published an article titled "Los violadores que son 'honorables' congresistas en Colombia" (The rapists who are 'honorable' congressmen in Colombia) accompanied by a photo of FARC senator Carlos Lozada. Lozada, who held one of the ten congressional seats reserved for the FARC since 2018 under the Colombian peace agreement, ⁣filed a defamation lawsuit against Vallejo and the PanAm Post in a Bogotá court. On October 25, 2019, Judge Hyman Alberto Hermosilla Reyes sided with Lozada and ordered Vallejo and the PanAm Post to retract their statements, citing a "complete lack of defense arguments" and numerous inaccuracies in Vallejo's article that "demonstrate[d] the interest of Vanessa Vallejo in misinforming the international community."

Vallejo and the PanAm Post appealed the decision, arguing that the PanAm Post was not responsible for the personal opinion expressed by its editor on its platform. Furthermore, Vallejo provided evidence from the victims' rights group Corporación Rosa Blanca to substantiate her claims that Lozada had committed sexual violence during the Colombian conflict. On March 10, 2020, Judge Hermosillo Reyes overturned his previous ruling in light of the new evidence. The PanAm Post published an article that celebrated the appeal as a "small triumph for liberty."

Coverage of Venezuelan opposition 
In mid-2019, PanAm Post editor-in-chief Orlando Avendaño published investigative articles that alleged the involvement of Venezuelan politicians in corruption. On June 15, Avendaño authored an investigative report that claimed that the disputed acting president of Venezuela, Juan Guaidó, had improperly used humanitarian aid funds to maintain military officials who deserted to Cúcuta during the 2019 Venezuelan presidential crisis. Then on August 23, Avendaño published an article that asserted that opposition politician Henry Ramos Allup had participated in a corruption scheme involving the state oil company PDVSA. Ramos's Democratic Action party responded by categorically denying the claims and accusing the PanAm Post of defamation. In a letter, party officials alleged that Ramos was the target of a defamation campaign as a result of his "strong and unwavering support" for Juan Guaidó.

In response to accusations of biased coverage of Venezuelan opposition politicians, the PanAm Post staff published an editorial three days later defending the veracity of their reporting and decision to criticize certain opposition politicians. The editorial also acknowledged their ideological affinity for the views of Diego Arria, Antonio Ledezma, and María Corina Machado, calling them "representatives of a true opposition." Editor-in-chief Orlando Avendaño later asserted that their endorsement of María Corina Machado's political views was a matter of personal conviction and not related to Machado's familial ties with the PanAm Post's owner, Luis Henrique Ball, who is Machado's third cousin.

References

External links
PanAm Post on Facebook
PanAm Post on Twitter

American news websites
Free market
Pan-Americanism
Culture of Miami
2013 establishments in Florida
Spanish-language websites